Tumsa Nahin Dekha may refer to:

Tumsa Nahin Dekha (1957 film)
Tumsa Nahin Dekha (2004 film)